This is a list of Japanese films that are scheduled to release in 2022.

Highest-grossing films
The following is a list of the 10 highest-grossing Japanese films released at the Japanese box office during 2022.

Film releases

January – March

April - June

July - September

October - December

See also
 List of 2022 box office number-one films in Japan
 2022 in Japan
 2022 in Japanese television

References

External links
 

Film
2022
Lists of 2022 films by country or language